Xuxa is a Brazilian singer, actress, and television show hostess. 

Xuxa may also refer to:
Xuxa (TV series), a children's show
Xuxa (album), an album by the entertainer
Xuxa: The Mega-Marketing of Gender, Race, and Modernity, 1993 book
Fernando Scherer or Xuxa, Brazilian Olympic swimmer
Cássio Luís Rissardo or Xuxa, (born 1981), Brazilian footballer

See also
Susan (given name)